Dongfeng County is located in southwestern Jilin province, China and is under the administration of Liaoyuan City.

It is mainly agricultural with the main crops being wheat and maize (corn). 
Its major industry is a pharmaceutical company (Dongfeng Yaoye), after which the county town's main street is named. 
Deer are also raised for their meat and antlers, which are used in Chinese medicine.

It is a relatively poor county with salaries starting at Y300. Many people in the county town are unemployed and rely on riding "daoqilu" (pedicabs where the driver is seated at the back and the passengers at the front) and tuk tuks to make a living.

The county is linked by a single track railway to Liaoyuan and Siping in one direction and Meihekou in the other, with trains running to Beijing, Tonghua and Changchun amongst other places. There is also a frequent bus service to Meihekou, the nearest large town, which can also be reached by shared taxi for Y20 or Y5 a person. Buses also link Dongfeng with Liaoyuan, Siping, Changchun, Shenyang, and other cities and counties.

Temperatures range from up to 30 C in the short summer to minus 30 or even minus 40 C in the long winter, during which snow covers the ground and the rivers and drains are iced up.

Most of the people living in Dongfeng are Han Chinese, but there are also scattered ethnic Korean communities, and a Korean Township. However, the local media do not have any Korean language programmes or newspapers to cater for them and many of the Koreans in Dongfeng have lost their Korean language skills even though there is a Korean language secondary school and a Korean church available to them.

Administrative divisions
The county administers 12 towns, one township, and one ethnic township.

Climate

References

External links

 
County-level divisions of Jilin